DataLounge (also styled as Datalounge and The Data Lounge) is an internet forum. Its core community of predominantly anonymous posters share news, opinions, gossip, personal histories, and political views from a gay perspective.

While forum guidelines nominally require posters to be respectful of others, much of the site's appeal revolves around its appreciation of wit, satire, and "pointless bitchery", as well as a 25-plus-year shared history and its resulting in-jokes.

DataLounge has approximately 6.5 million page views each month, according to its webmaster. Mediapolis, a New York City interactive media company, created the site in May 1995.

History
DataLounge was launched by Mediapolis, Inc. in May 1995. During the site's early years, content included gay-oriented news, gossip, links to other sites/services, and editorial content, making it a gay web portal. Content contributors included New York drag queen Trudy and journalist Chris Barillas. DataLounge affiliated itself via the DataLounge Network with other gay-and-lesbian-oriented websites, including the dating site Edwina.com, the web guide Homorama, and Gay Health. A weekly email subscription was also offered to users.

By 2000, the site had evolved to encompass several discussion forums covering topics such as lesbian, religious, and sexual issues, along with a "Flames and Freaks" forum to house threads that site administrators determined to be disruptive to general forum discussion. Special-interest subforums for fans of The Lord of the Rings and U.S. daytime drama aficionados were created as well but subsequently closed. The most popular forum was the Gossip Forum, which dwarfed all others in both traffic and number of discussion threads created.

A portion of DataLounge, and the DataLounge Network's content, derived from the integration of some of the 1995–97 content of Out magazine's website, which closed in March 1997 (but subsequently reactivated) to focus on print content. Out.com users were redirected to DataLounge, and DataLounge administrators adopted Out.com's discussion forums, dating service, and weekly survey.

Site policies and technical changes 
In 2003, DataLounge instituted a subscription service that blocked all advertising for a $12 annual fee. This fee was subsequently raised to $15 and then to the present price of $18.

In 2005, DataLounge underwent a major redesign. All forum topics were collapsed into one general discussion forum called "The DataLounge Forum", and all news content, most references to the other sites in the DataLounge Network, and other features were discontinued. Editorial commentary discussing events continued to appear on the site. Users were also given the option to control aspects of the site's layout, including filtration of political, gossip, and/or "Flames and Freaks" (troll) threads.

The 2005 redesign also brought a policy change that limited access to the DataLounge Forum during high-traffic "Primetime" periods to fee-paying subscribers. This move was met with criticism from DataLounge users, as non-subscribers were completely shut out of the DataLounge Forum during these periods. DataLounge administrators asserted that Primetime was necessary to prevent slowdowns of other Mediapolis sites hosted on the same servers, and to generate revenue to cover DataLounge's hosting, bandwidth, and maintenance expenses. In the summer of 2007, DataLounge also instituted a policy that only paying members could start threads.

In May 2009, DataLounge launched another comprehensive redesign of the site, dubbed "V6", allowing users to embed photos and YouTube videos, as well as mark specific threads to watch. The new site was auto-refreshed in real-time as new posts were created. Another major site redesign was phased in during 2014 and 2015. Rather than multiple pages, the site now has a single "infinite scroll" page that hosts all non-archived threads. Individual threads consist of a single page as well.

This latest redesign's most significant feature overall is the ability to fine-tune the user experience to filter out offensive content. A "Flames and Freaks" slider setting allows for global adjustment between two extremes: "Delicate Flower" (blocks most troll posts) and "Asbestos Eyeballs" (no filtering). Users can also ignore individual posters and/or entire threads, as well as bestow "Wit and Wisdom" (WW) or "Flames and Freaks" (FF) (similar to upvoting/downvoting at Reddit). Threads and posts with a certain number of FFs are grayed out and the text struck through. Particularly annoying or offensive trolls are "red-tagged"—the webmaster labels the troll's posts with a red label (e.g., "Troll 5529") and sometimes a description or comment (such as "Stop responding to this freak").

In another measure to manage trolling, the latest iteration of DataLounge uses cookie-based tracking to assign "reputation" to site visitors. Non-paying visitors may start threads, but they must lurk for a minimum of a few hours to a few days, without clearing their browser cookies, to gain permission to post in threads, give WWs/FFs, and vote in polls. Posters with excessive negative reputation (that is, FFs and ignores) forfeit these privileges. Posters who clear their cookies lose their reputation and must restart the process to regain privileges; subscribers do not lose reputation as long as they log in and abide by DL's rules.

Members and moderation 
DataLoungers may insert any name into the username field when they create a post. Posters used to have the choice to be totally anonymous, post under any name of their choosing as per above, or be authenticated (registered with a unique email address). Authenticated users were distinguished by "(authenticated)" after their usernames in posts, setting them apart from any trolls who used the same names.

Authenticated posters were numerous in DataLounge's early years, and some users became notable characters on the site; over time, however, site culture came to discourage authenticated posting as attention-seeking. Some authenticated posters were also criticized for their comments. As a result, most comments today are anonymous.

In May 2019 DataLounge adopted mandatory email-based registration in an additional effort to combat trolling (users will continue to be able to post anonymously).

DataLounge is largely self-moderated, but from time to time, threads are closed or deleted by "Muriel", as the webmaster is nicknamed today.

DataLounge community 
Community members are often identified by other members (or sometimes self-identify) as "trolls" because they're fans of a particular celebrity, or enthusiastic about a certain topic. The Gap Playlists Guy is a former Gap employee who enthusiastically discusses the in-store playlists from years past, while the Lisa Whelchel Troll is a devotee of former Facts of Life actress Lisa Whelchel.

The DataLounge has several shared narratives or stories that have carried forth through the years. Some of these involve collective, collaborative posts that include recurring characters. Sarcastic and darkly comic comments about child rearing and motherhood might be signed, for example, by "Mrs. Patsy Ramsey." A former poster from the board, "Cheryl," eventually because a "character" used on various threads.

Several of the site's most memorable shared stories and narratives emerged around news stories, especially in response to events like the shared trauma of 9/11, where responses varied between heartbreak and gallows humor.

Gossip 
DataLounge has been an active repository for gossip since its inception. In the initial years of DataLounge, its  under-the-radar status as a gay and lesbian-focused forum encouraged some entertainment industry sources to "spill the tea" and post at the site.

While the reliability of gossip items has always been questionable, DataLounge is still frequently mentioned as a source on items at other news and gossip sites, including NewNowNext, Gawker, Queerty, The Advocate, and Dlisted.

The site has been inundated in recent years with news items, discussions and threads that approach an obsessive quality, all with narratives about celebrities and/or their personal relationships, including several threads about actors, and various gossip items regarding conflict within the British royal family.

Marcia Cross controversy 
DataLounge made mainstream news in February 2005, when a "friendly spy" claiming to work at ABC posted that Desperate Housewives actress Marcia Cross was preparing to come out as a lesbian in an upcoming issue of The Advocate.

Within days, the rumor spread rapidly and garnered mentions in the media—including CNN, Entertainment Weekly, and Fox Television's Los Angeles affiliate—before Cross denied the rumors in an interview with Barbara Walters and her co-hosts on The View. The Advocate published an article chronicling this incident.

Less than six months later, Cross announced her engagement to stockbroker Tom Mahoney. Many DataLounge posters assumed that Cross—believed by many posters to be a closeted lesbian, owing to both direct assertions made by gossip columnist and DataLounge user Michael Musto and the fact that she had not, to anyone's public knowledge, dated a man since her then-boyfriend Richard Jordan died of a brain tumor in 1993—had entered into a relationship of convenience at the urging of her PR team in order to quash the rumors about her sexual orientation.

Notable DataLounge visitors 
Rosie O'Donnell has mentioned visiting DataLounge in magazine interviews

Author, entrepreneur, and reality TV personality Josh Kilmer-Purcell is a onetime DL authenticated poster, who used to post as "josh"

Fashionable talk show host Andy Cohen has referred to DataLounge as “a vile pit of trollery"

See also 
 Homosocialization
 Vivian Vance

References

External links
 DataLounge front page
 Mediapolis Press website

American social networking websites
Internet properties established in 1995
LGBT-related websites